The Commonwealth of Independent States (CIS) is a regional intergovernmental organization in Eurasia. It was formed following the dissolution of the Soviet Union in 1991. The CIS encourages cooperation in economic, political and military affairs and has certain powers relating to the coordination of trade, finance, lawmaking, and security. It has also promoted cooperation on cross-border crime prevention.

As the Soviet Union disintegrated, Belarus, Russia and Ukraine signed the Belovezh Accords on 8 December 1991, declaring that the Union had effectively ceased to exist and proclaimed the CIS in its place. On 21 December, the Alma-Ata Protocol was signed. The Baltic states (Estonia, Latvia and Lithuania), which regard their membership in the Soviet Union as an illegal occupation, chose not to participate. Georgia withdrew its membership in 2008 following the Russo-Georgian War. Ukraine formally ended its participation in CIS statutory bodies in 2018, although it had stopped participating in the organization much earlier.

Eight of the nine CIS member states participate in the CIS Free Trade Area. Three organizations originated from the CIS, namely the Collective Security Treaty Organization, the Eurasian Economic Union (alongside subdivisions, the Eurasian Customs Union and the Eurasian Economic Space); and the Union State. While the first and the second are military and economic alliances, the third aims to reach a supranational union of Russia and Belarus with a common government, currency, and so on.

History and structure

Background

The CIS as a shared Russophone social, cultural, and economic space has its origins with the Russian Empire, which was replaced in 1917 by the Russian Republic after the February Revolution earlier that year. Following the October Revolution, the Russian Soviet Federative Socialist Republic became the leading republic in the Soviet Union (USSR) upon its creation with the 1922 Treaty and Declaration of the Creation of the USSR along with Byelorussian SSR, Ukrainian SSR and Transcaucasian SFSR. 

After the end of the dissolution process of the Soviet Union, Russia and the Central Asian republics were weakened economically and faced declines in GDP. Post-Soviet states underwent economic reforms and privatisation. The process of Eurasian integration began immediately after the break-up of the Soviet Union to salvage economic ties with Post-Soviet republics.

Founding
Following the events of a failed coup, many republics of the USSR declared their independence fearing another coup.

The CIS announced that the new organization would be open to all republics of the former Soviet Union, and to other nations sharing the same goals. The CIS charter stated that all the members were sovereign and independent nations and thereby effectively abolished the Soviet Union. On 21 December 1991, the leaders of eight additional former Soviet Republics (Armenia, Azerbaijan, Kazakhstan, Kyrgyzstan, Moldova, Turkmenistan, Tajikistan and Uzbekistan) signed the Alma-Ata Protocol which can either be interpreted as expanding the CIS to these states or the proper foundation or foundation date of the CIS, thus bringing the number of participating countries to 11. Georgia joined two years later, in December 1993. At this point, 12 of the 15 former Soviet Republics participated in the CIS. The three Baltic states did not, reflecting their governments' and people's view that the post-1940 Soviet occupation of their territory was illegitimate. The CIS and Soviet Union also legally co-existed briefly with each other until 26 December 1991, when the Soviet of the Republics formally dissolved the Soviet Union. This was followed by Ivan Korotchenya becoming Executive Secretary of the CIS on the same day.

CIS Charter

On 22 January 1993, the Charter (Statutes) of the CIS were signed, setting up the different institutions of the CIS, their functions, the rules and statutes of the CIS. The Charter also defined that all countries have ratified the Agreement on the Establishment of the CIS and its relevant (Alma-Ata) Protocol would be considered to be founding states of the CIS, as well as those only countries ratifying the Charter would be considered to be member states of the CIS (art. 7). Other states can participate as associate members or observers if accepted as such by a decision of the Council of Heads of State to the CIS (art. 8). All the founding states apart from Ukraine and Turkmenistan ratified the Charter of the CIS and became member states of it. Nevertheless, Ukraine and Turkmenistan kept participating in the CIS, without being its members.

General Secretary
Between 1991 and 2009, the work of CIS was coordinated by the General Secretary.

Interparliamentary Assembly
The Interparliamentary Assembly was established on 27 March 1992 in Kazakhstan. On 26 May 1995 CIS leaders signed the Convention on the Interparliamentary Assembly of Member Nations of the Commonwealth of Independent States eventually ratified by nine parliaments. Under the terms of the convention, the IPA was invested with international legitimacy and is housed in the Tauride Palace in St Petersburg and acts as the consultative parliamentary wing of the CIS created to discuss problems of parliamentary cooperation and reviews draft documents of common interest and passes model laws to the national legislatures in the CIS (as well as recommendations) for their use in the preparation of new laws and amendments to existing legislation too which have been adopted by more than 130 documents that ensure the convergence of laws in the CIS to the national legislation. The Assembly is actively involved in the development of integration processes in the CIS and also sends observers to the national elections. The Assembly held its 32nd Plenary meeting in Saint Petersburg on 14 May 2009.

Further developments 
Between 2003 and 2005, three CIS member states experienced a change of government in a series of colour revolutions: Eduard Shevardnadze was overthrown in Georgia; Viktor Yushchenko was elected in Ukraine; and Askar Akayev was toppled in Kyrgyzstan.

In March 2007, Igor Ivanov, the secretary of the Russian Security Council, expressed his doubts concerning the usefulness of the CIS, emphasizing that the Eurasian Economic Community was becoming a more competent organization to unify the largest countries of the CIS. Following the withdrawal of Georgia, the presidents of Uzbekistan, Tajikistan, and Turkmenistan skipped the October 2009 meeting of the CIS, each having their own issues and disagreements with the Russian Federation.

In May 2009, Armenia, Azerbaijan, Belarus, Georgia, Moldova, and Ukraine joined the Eastern Partnership, a project which was initiated by the European Union (EU).

Membership 
There are nine full member states of the Commonwealth of Independent States.

The Creation Agreement remained the main constituent document of the CIS until January 1993, when the CIS Charter was adopted. The charter formalized the concept of membership: a member country is defined as a country that ratifies the CIS Charter (sec. 2, art. 7).  Parties to CIS Creation Agreement but not the Charter are considered to be "Founding States" but not full members.

Two states, Ukraine and Turkmenistan, have ratified the CIS Creation Agreement, making them "founding states of the CIS", but did not ratify the subsequent Charter that would make them members of the CIS. These states, while not being formal members of the CIS, were allowed to participate in CIS. They were also allowed to participate in various CIS initiatives, e.g. the Commonwealth of Independent States Free Trade Area, which were, however, formulated mostly as independent multilateral agreements, and not as internal CIS agreements. Additionally, Ukraine became an associate member state of the CIS Economic Union in 1994 and Turkmenistan an associate member state of the CIS in 2005. However, the Verkhovna Rada did not ratify the agreement on associate membership in accordance with the CIS Charter.  As a result, De jure Ukraine only had the status of a "founding state", without even being an associate member.

Turkmenistan 
Turkmenistan has not ratified the Charter and therefore is not formally a member of the CIS. Nevertheless, it has consistently participated in the CIS as if it were a member state. Turkmenistan changed its CIS standing to associate member as of 26 August 2005. The cited reason was to be consistent with its 1995-proclaimed, UN-recognised, international neutrality status, but experts have cited the country no longer needing Russia to provide natural gas access, as well as the country's declining faith in the confederation's ability to maintain internal stability in light of the Colour Revolutions.

Ukraine 

Although Ukraine was one of the states which ratified the Creation Agreement in December 1991, making it a Founding State of the CIS, it chose not to ratify the CIS Charter as it disagrees with Russia being the only legal successor state to the Soviet Union. Thus it has never been a full member of the CIS. However, Ukraine kept participating in the CIS, despite not being a member.  In 1993, Ukraine became an associate member of the Economic Union of the CIS.

Following the Russian military intervention in Ukraine and annexation of Crimea, relations between Ukraine and Russia deteriorated, leading Ukraine to consider ending its participation in the CIS.  As Ukraine never ratified the Charter, it could cease its informal participation in the CIS.  However, to fully terminate its relationship with the CIS, it would need to legally withdraw from the Creation Agreement, as Georgia did previously. On 14 March 2014, a bill was introduced to Ukraine's parliament to denounce their ratification of the CIS Creation Agreement, but it was never approved.  Following the 2014 parliamentary election, a new bill to denounce the CIS agreement was introduced.  In September 2015, the Ukrainian Ministry of Foreign Affairs confirmed Ukraine will continue taking part in the CIS "on a selective basis". Since that month, Ukraine has had no representatives in the CIS Executive Committee building. In April 2018, Ukrainian President Petro Poroshenko indicated that Ukraine would formally leave the CIS. As of 1 June, the CIS secretariat had not received formal notice from Ukraine of its withdrawal from the CIS, a process that will take one year to complete, following notice being given.

On 19 May 2018, Poroshenko signed a decree formally ending Ukraine's participation in CIS statutory bodies. The CIS secretariat stated that it will continue inviting Ukraine to participate. Ukraine has further stated that it intends to review its participation in all CIS agreements and only continue in those that are in its interests.

Georgia 

Following the overthrow of Eduard Shevardnadze in Georgia, Georgia officially withdrew from the Council of Defense Ministers in February 2006, stating that "Georgia has taken a course to join NATO and it cannot be part of two military structures simultaneously".  However,  it remained a full member of the CIS.

In the aftermath of the Russo-Georgian War in 2008, President Saakashvili announced during a public speech in the capital city Tbilisi that Georgia would leave the CIS and the Georgian Parliament voted unanimously on 14 August 2008 to withdraw from the regional organization. On 18 August 2008 the Ministry of Foreign Affairs of Georgia sent a note to the CIS Executive Committee notifying it of the aforesaid resolutions of the Parliament of Georgia and Georgia’s withdrawal from CIS. In accordance with the CIS Charter (sec. 1, art. 9), Georgia's withdrawal came into effect 12 months later, on 18 August 2009.

Moldova 
In light of Russia's support for the independence of occupied regions within Moldova, Georgia, and Ukraine as well as its violation of the Istanbul Agreement (see Adapted Conventional Armed Forces in Europe Treaty), legislative initiatives to denounce the agreement on the creation of CIS were tabled in Moldova's parliament on 25 March 2014, though they were not approved.  A similar bill was proposed in January 2018.

On 14 June 2022, Moldovan Minister of Foreign Affairs Nicu Popescu said the Moldovan government was considering the prospect of leaving the CIS, although at the end of May President Maia Sandu had said the country would not leave for the time being. An August 2021 poll conducted in Moldova (prior to the start of Russia's invasion of neighbouring Ukraine) found that 48.1% of respondents supported Moldova's withdrawal from the CIS. On 30 November 2022, Popescu stated that Moldova will suspend its participation in CIS meetings, and on 23 February 2023 stated that Moldova has started denouncing multiple treaties that the country signed with the CIS, as his country aims to join the European Union.

Politics

Human rights 
Since its inception, one of the primary goals of the CIS has been to provide a forum for discussing issues related to the social and economic development of the newly independent states. To achieve this goal member states have agreed to promote and protect human rights. Initially, efforts to achieve this goal consisted merely of statements of goodwill, but on 26 May 1995, the CIS adopted a Commonwealth of Independent States Convention on Human Rights and Fundamental Freedoms.

In 1991, four years before the 1995 human rights treaty, article 33 of the Charter of the CIS created a Human Rights Commission with its seat in Minsk, Belarus. This was confirmed by the decision of the Council of Heads of States of the CIS in 1993. In 1995, the CIS adopted a human rights treaty that includes civil and political as well as social and economic human rights. This treaty entered into force in 1998. The CIS treaty is modelled on the European Convention on Human Rights, but lacking the strong implementation mechanisms of the latter. In the CIS treaty, the Human Rights Commission has very vaguely defined authority. The Statute of the Human Rights Commission, however, also adopted by the CIS Member States as a decision, gives the commission the right to receive inter-state as well as individual communications.

CIS members, especially in Central Asia, continue to have among the world's poorest human rights records. Many activists point to examples such as the 2005 Andijan massacre in Uzbekistan to show that there has been almost no improvement in human rights since the collapse of the Soviet Union in Central Asia. The consolidation of power by President Vladimir Putin has resulted in a steady decline in the modest progress of previous years in Russia. In turn, this has led to little to no scrutiny by Russia when it comes to the situation of human rights in other CIS member states. The Commonwealth of Independent States continues to face serious challenges in meeting even basic international standards.

Military 

The CIS Charter establishes the Council of Ministers of Defence, which is vested with the task of coordinating military cooperation of the CIS member states. To this end, the Council develops conceptual approaches to the questions of military and defence policy of the CIS member states; develops proposals aimed to prevent armed conflicts on the territory of the member states or with their participation; gives expert opinions on draft treaties and agreements related to the questions of defence and military developments; issues related suggestions and proposals to the attention of the CIS Council of the Heads of State. Also important is the council's work on the approximation of the legal acts in the area of defence and military development.

During a speech at Moscow State University in 1994, the President of Kazakhstan, Nursultan Nazarbayev, suggested the idea of creating a "common defense" space within the CIS. Nazarbayev's idea was quickly seen as a way to bolster trade, boost investments in the region, and serve as a counterweight to the West and East Asia.

An important manifestation of integration processes in the area of military and defence collaboration of the CIS member states is the creation, in 1995, of the joint CIS Air Defense System. Over the years, the military personnel of the joint CIS Air Defense System grew twofold along the western, European border of the CIS, and by 1.5 times on its southern borders.

When Boris Yeltsin became Russian Defence Minister on 7 May 1992, Yevgeny Shaposhnikov, was appointed as Commander-in-Chief of the CIS Armed Forces, and his staff were ejected from the MOD and General Staff buildings and given offices in the former Warsaw Pact Headquarters at 41 Leningradsky Prospekt on the northern outskirts of Moscow. Shaposhnikov resigned in June 1993.

In December 1993, the CIS Armed Forces Headquarters was abolished. Instead, "the CIS Council of Defence Ministers created a CIS Military Cooperation Coordination Headquarters (MCCH) in Moscow, with 50 percent of the funding provided by Russia." General Viktor Samsonov was appointed as Chief of Staff. The headquarters has now moved to 101000, Москва, Сверчков переулок, 3/2, and 41 Leningradsky Prospekt has now been taken over by another Russian MOD agency.

Economy 

In 1994, negotiations were initiated between the CIS countries on establishing a free trade area (FTA), but no agreement was signed. A proposed free trade agreement would have covered all twelve then CIS members and treaty parties except Turkmenistan.

In 2009, a new agreement was begun to create a FTA, the CIS Free Trade Agreement (CISFTA). In October 2011, the new free trade agreement was signed by eight of the eleven CIS prime ministers; Armenia, Belarus, Kazakhstan, Kyrgyzstan, Moldova, Russia, Tajikistan, and Ukraine at a meeting in St. Petersburg. Initially, the treaty was only ratified by Russia, Belarus, and Ukraine, however by the end of 2012, Kazakhstan, Armenia, and Moldova had also completed ratification. In December 2013, Uzbekistan, signed and then ratified the treaty, while the remaining two signatories, Kyrgyzstan and Tajikistan later both ratified the treaty in January 2014 and December 2015 respectively. Azerbaijan is the only full CIS member state not to participate in the free trade area.

The free trade agreement eliminates export and import duties on several goods but also contains a number of exemptions that will ultimately be phased out. An agreement was also signed on the basic principles of currency regulation and currency controls in the CIS at the same October 2011 meeting.

Corruption and bureaucracy are serious problems for trade in CIS countries.

Kazakhstan's President Nursultan Nazarbayev proposed that CIS members take up a digitization agenda to modernize CIS economies.

Common Economic Space

After a discussion about the creation of a common economic space between the Commonwealth of Independent States (CIS) countries of Russia, Ukraine, Belarus, and Kazakhstan, agreement in principle about the creation of this space was announced after a meeting in the Moscow suburb of Novo-Ogarevo on 23 February 2003. The Common Economic Space would involve a supranational commission on trade and tariffs that would be based in Kyiv, would initially be headed by a representative of Kazakhstan, and would not be subordinate to the governments of the four nations. The ultimate goal would be a regional organization that would be open for other countries to join as well, and could eventually lead even to a single currency.

On 22 May 2003, the Verkhovna Rada (the Ukrainian Parliament) voted 266 votes in favour and 51 against the joint economic space. However, most believe that Viktor Yushchenko's victory in the Ukrainian presidential election of 2004 was a significant blow against the project: Yushchenko had shown renewed interest in Ukrainian membership in the European Union and such membership would be incompatible with the envisioned common economic space. Yushchenko's successor Viktor Yanukovych stated on 27 April 2010 "Ukraine's entry into the Customs Union of Russia, Belarus and Kazakhstan is not possible today, since the economic principles and the laws of the WTO do not allow it, we develop our policy following WTO principles". Ukraine has been a WTO member since 2008.

A Customs Union of Belarus, Kazakhstan and Russia was thus created in 2010, A single market had been envisioned for 2012, but instead the customs union was renamed as the Eurasian Customs Union and expanded to include Armenia and Kyrgyzstan in 2015.

Economic data

Associated organisations

Organisation of Central Asian Cooperation
Kazakhstan, Kyrgyzstan, Tajikistan, Turkmenistan and Uzbekistan formed the OCAC in 1991 as Central Asian Commonwealth (CAC). The organisation continued in 1994 as the Central Asian Economic Union (CAEU), in which Tajikistan and Turkmenistan did not participate. In 1998 it became the Central Asian Economic Cooperation (CAEC), which marked the return of Tajikistan. On 28 February 2002, it was renamed to its current name. Russia joined on 28 May 2004. On 7 October 2005, it was decided between the member states that Uzbekistan will join the Eurasian Economic Community and that the organisations will merge. The organisations joined on 25 January 2006. It is not clear what will happen to the status of current CACO observers that are not observers to EurAsEC (Georgia and Turkey).

Community for Democracy and Rights of Nations

The post-Soviet disputed states of Abkhazia, Artsakh, South Ossetia, and Transnistria are all members of the Community for Democracy and Rights of Nations which aims to forge closer integration among the members.

Other activities

Election monitoring
The CIS-Election Monitoring Organisation is an election monitoring body that was formed in October 2002, following a Commonwealth of Independent States heads of states meeting which adopted the Convention on the Standards of Democratic Elections, Electoral Rights, and Freedoms in the Member States of the Commonwealth of Independent States. The CIS-EMO has been sending election observers to member countries of the CIS since this time.

Controversies

The election monitoring body has approved many elections which have been heavily criticised by independent observers.
 The democratic nature of the final round of the 2004 Ukrainian presidential election which followed the Orange Revolution and brought into power the former opposition, was questioned by the CIS while the Organization for Security and Co-operation in Europe (OSCE) found no significant problems. This was the first time that the CIS observation teams challenged the validity of an election, saying that it should be considered illegitimate. On 15 March 2005, the Ukrainian Independent Information Agency quoted Dmytro Svystkov (a spokesman of the Ukrainian Foreign Ministry) that Ukraine has suspended its participation in the CIS election monitoring organization.
 The CIS praised the Uzbekistan parliamentary elections, 2005 as "legitimate, free and transparent" while the OSCE had referred to the Uzbek elections as having fallen "significantly short of OSCE commitments and other international standards for democratic elections".
 Moldovan authorities refused to invite CIS observers in the 2005 Moldovan parliamentary elections, an action Russia criticised. Many dozens such observers from Belarus and Russia were stopped from reaching Moldova.
 CIS observers monitored the Tajikistan parliamentary elections, 2005 and in the end declared them "legal, free and transparent." The same elections were pronounced by the OSCE to have failed international standards for democratic elections.
 Soon after CIS observers hailed the Kyrgyz parliamentary elections of 2005 as "well-organized, free, and fair", as large-scale and often violent demonstrations broke out throughout the country protesting what the opposition called a rigged parliamentary election. In contrast, the OSCE reported that the elections fell short of international standards in many areas.
 International observers of the Interparliamentary Assembly stated the 2010 local elections in Ukraine were organised well. While the Council of Europe uncovered a number of problems in relation to a new electorate law approved just prior to the elections and the Obama administration criticised the conduct of the elections, saying they "did not meet standards for openness and fairness".

Russian language status
Russia has urged that the Russian language receive official status in all of the CIS member states. So far Russian is an official language in only four states: Russia, Belarus, Kazakhstan, and Kyrgyzstan. Russian is also considered an official language in the region of Transnistria and the autonomous region of Gagauzia in Moldova. Viktor Yanukovych, the Moscow-supported presidential candidate in the controversial 2004 Ukrainian presidential election, declared his intention to make Russian an official second language of Ukraine. However, the Western-supported candidate Viktor Yushchenko, who eventually won, successfully opposed the idea. After his early 2010 election, President Yanukovych stated (on 9 March 2010), "Ukraine will continue to promote the Ukrainian language as its only state language."

Sports events
At the time of the Soviet Union's dissolution in December 1991, its sports teams had been invited to or qualified for various 1992 sports events. A joint CIS team took its place in some of these. The "Unified Team" competed in the 1992 Winter Olympics and 1992 Summer Olympics, and a CIS association football team competed in UEFA Euro 1992. A CIS bandy team played some friendlies in January 1992 and made its last appearance at the 1992 Russian Government Cup, where it also played against the new Russia national bandy team. The Soviet Union bandy championship for 1991–1992 was rebranded as a CIS championship.

Since then, the CIS members have each competed separately in international sports.

In 2017, a festival for national sports and games, known as the Festival of National Sports and Games of the Commonwealth of Independent States was held in Ulyanovsk. The main sports were sambo, tug of war, mas-wrestling, gorodki, belt wrestling, lapta, bandy (rink), kettlebell lifting, chess and archery. A few demonstration sports were also a part of the programme.

Cultural events
The CIS has also been a relevant forum to support cultural relations between former Soviet republics. In 2006, the Council of the Heads of Governments of the CIS launched the Intergovernmental Foundation for Educational, Scientific, and Cultural Cooperation (IFESCCO). IFESSCO has substantially relied on Russia's financial support since its creation and supported several multilateral cultural events, including the ‘CIS Capital of Culture’ initiative. In 2017, the Armenian city of Goris was declared the CIS Cultural Capital of the year.

Life expectancy
Life expectancy at birth in the countries of CIS in 2020, according to the World Bank Group.

See also

 Collective Security Treaty Organization
 Eurasianism
 Russian world
 Comecon
 Community for Democracy and Rights of Nations
 Eastern Bloc
 Eurasian Economic Union
 Lublin Triangle
 Post-Soviet states
 Unified Team

Notes

References

Journals

External links

 
 CIS Executive Committee
 Interstate Statistical Committee of the CIS

 
Post-Soviet states
Confederations
Dissolution of the Soviet Union
Post-Soviet alliances
United Nations General Assembly observers
Organizations established in 1991
1991 establishments in Asia
1991 establishments in Europe
1991 establishments in the Soviet Union